Bean Bags is an album by vibraphonist Milt Jackson and saxophonist Coleman Hawkins featuring performances recorded in 1958 and released on the Atlantic label.

Reception 
The Allmusic review by Scott Yanow awarded the album 4 stars, stating: "Many of vibraphonist Milt Jackson's Atlantic recordings are long overdue to appear on CD, and that certainly includes Bean Bags, which features a meeting with the great tenor Coleman Hawkins. Assisted by a top-notch quartet."

Track listing 
All compositions by Milt Jackson except as indicated
 "Close Your Eyes" (Bernice Petkere) - 7:25 
 "Stuffy" (Coleman Hawkins) - 5:41 
 "Don't Take Your Love From Me" (Henry Nemo) - 4:49 
 "Get Happy" (Harold Arlen, Ted Koehler) - 5:28 
 "Sandra's Blues" - 6:38 
 "Indian Blues" - 6:07

Personnel 
 Milt Jackson – vibes
 Coleman Hawkins - tenor saxophone
 Tommy Flanagan - piano
 Kenny Burrell - guitar
 Eddie Jones - bass
 Connie Kay - – drums

References 

Atlantic Records albums
Milt Jackson albums
Coleman Hawkins albums
1959 albums
Albums produced by Nesuhi Ertegun